Halvdan Wexelsen Freihow (22 November 1883 – 20 December 1965) was a Norwegian priest and culturist.

He was born in Tana, and graduated with the cand.theol. degree in 1909. In 1937 he earned the dr.philos. degree for a thesis on the psychological aspect of Henrik Ibsen's Brand. He was an avid proponent of the written language form Nynorsk, and chaired Noregs Ungdomslag from 1926 to 1936. He was later a vicar in Skien.

During the occupation of Norway by Nazi Germany he was arrested by the occupiers. He was imprisoned in Åkebergveien and Arkivet, then Grini concentration camp from 12 May to 12 June 1943.

He was the father of the diplomat Håkon Wexelsen Freihow.

References

1883 births
1965 deaths
People from Tana, Norway
20th-century Norwegian Lutheran clergy
Nynorsk-language writers
Henrik Ibsen researchers
Norwegian resistance members
Grini concentration camp survivors